Ivan Popov (23 March 1951 – June 2014) was a Bulgarian cyclist. He competed in the individual road race and team time trial events at the 1976 Summer Olympics.

References

External links
 

1951 births
2014 deaths
Bulgarian male cyclists
Olympic cyclists of Bulgaria
Cyclists at the 1976 Summer Olympics
Sportspeople from Sofia Province